(The Impresario), K. 486, is a comic singspiel by Wolfgang Amadeus Mozart, set to a German libretto by Gottlieb Stephanie, an Austrian Schauspieldirektor. Originally, it was written because of "the imperial command" of the Holy Roman Emperor Joseph II who had invited 80 guests to a private luncheon.
It is regarded as "a parody on the vanity of singers", who argue over status and pay.

Mozart, who describes it as "comedy with music" wrote it as his entry in a musical competition which was given a private performance hosted on 7 February 1786 by Joseph II at the Schönbrunn Palace in Vienna. This competition pitted a German singspiel, presented at one end of the room, against a competing Italian opera, the Italian entry being Antonio Salieri's opera buffa, Prima la musica e poi le parole (First the Music, then the Words), which was then given at the other end of the room. The premiere was followed by the first of three public performances given four days later at the Kärntnertor Theater, Vienna, on 11 February.

Composition history
The work was written during a very creative period in Mozart's life, at the same time as his Le nozze di Figaro, which premiered later the same year, along with three piano concertos and "another dozen major works".

In addition to the overture, there are only four vocal numbers in the score, and the musical content (about 30 minutes) is surrounded by much spoken dialogue, typical in its day. One highlight, which Erik Smith describes as very funny, is where "each lady sings about the nobility of her art while trying to defeat her rival with ever higher notes". Although it has been described as a "silly farce", Mozart appears to have taken the opportunity to write serious arias and thus the "audition" of Madame Herz includes her aria "" ("There tolls the hour of departure"), while Mme Silberklang sings the elegant rondo, "" ("Dearest Youth").

Performance history

The opera was first presented in the United Kingdom on 30 May 1857 at the St James's Theatre in London and given its US premiere at the Stadt Theatre in New York on 9 November 1870.

In modern times, the text is usually completely rewritten for contemporary relevance, which was the case for the 2014 production given by the Santa Fe Opera.  There it had "English dialogue by the British dramatist Ranjit Bolt and additional Mozart concert arias folded into the score" with the action taking place in Paris in the 1920s.
The cast included Anthony Michaels-Moore, Brenda Rae, Meredith Arwady, and Erin Morley.

The 1966 recording by the English Chamber Orchestra (conducted by André Previn), was performed with an English libretto penned by Previn's then wife Dory Previn, who transplanted the amusing tale to the 20th century.

Bronx Opera performed it in 1972, 2008, and in 2021, due to the COVID-19 pandemic, as a video version in Zoom format.

Roles

Synopsis
Place: Vienna
Time: 1786

Frank, the impresario (along with the buffo singer, Buff, who assists him) audition two actresses to be part of his new theatrical company. While both are hired, they then argue over who will get the prime role and who will be paid the most. To illustrate their strengths, each sings a striking aria to back her claim (Herz: "", Silberklang: ""). An agreement is reached when the tenor, Vogelsang, intervenes, in what Julian Rushton describes as a hilarious trio, "" (I am the prima donna) compromise is agreed to with each receiving "large salaries and star billing". The work ended with the quartet "" (Every artist strives for glory).

Recordings

References 
Notes

Sources

External links
 
 Libretto, critical editions, diplomatic editions, source evaluation (German only), links to online DME recordings; Digital Mozart Edition
Synopsis from Stanford University

Extensive list of recordings (1938–2006) and some audio, Mozarteum's digital Neue Mozart-Ausgabe
, Judith Howarth; Colin Davis conducting (1991)
, Yvonne Kenny; Colin Davis conducting (1991)
, Kenny, Howarth, Barry Banks; Colin Davis conducting (1991)
, Kenny, Howarth, Banks, Matthew Best; Colin Davis conducting (1991)

Operas by Wolfgang Amadeus Mozart
German-language operas
Singspiele
1786 operas
Operas
One-act operas